Hotel Mumbai is a 2018 action thriller film directed by Anthony Maras and co-written by Maras and John Collee. An Indian-Australian-American co-production, it is inspired by the 2009 documentary Surviving Mumbai about the 2008 Mumbai attacks at the Taj Mahal Palace Hotel in India. The film stars Dev Patel, Armie Hammer, Nazanin Boniadi, Anupam Kher, Tilda Cobham-Hervey, Jason Isaacs, Suhail Nayyar, Nagesh Bhosle, and Natasha Liu Bordizzo.

The film premiered at the Toronto International Film Festival on 7 September 2018, and had its Australian premiere at the Adelaide Film Festival on 10 October 2018. The film was released in Australia and the United States on 14 and 22 March 2019, respectively, and in India on 29 November 2019.

Plot 
On 26 November 2008, waiter Arjun reports for work at the Taj Mahal Palace Hotel in Mumbai, India, under head chef Hemant Oberoi. The day's guests include British-Iranian heiress Zahra Kashani and her American husband David, with their infant son Cameron and his nanny Sally, as well as ex-Spetznaz operative Vasili.

That night, terrorists from the Lashkar-e-Taiba organization, under the command of "the Bull", launch a coordinated assault against 12 locations across Mumbai, including the hotel. As the local police are not properly trained or equipped to handle the attack, they are forced to wait for reinforcements from New Delhi. In the ensuing chaos, Arjun, David, Zahra and Vasili are trapped in the hotel restaurant with several other guests while Sally remains with Cameron in their hotel room. A woman fleeing from the terrorists enters the hotel room, and Sally hides with Cameron in a closet as the terrorists shoot the woman and then leave.

Hearing of Sally's close encounter, David manages to sneak past the terrorists and successfully reach Sally and Cameron. Meanwhile, Arjun escorts the other guests to the Chambers Lounge, an exclusive club hidden within the hotel, where they hope to remain safe. David, Sally and Cameron attempt to regroup with the others, but David is captured and bound by the terrorists while Sally and Cameron are trapped inside a closet.

Meanwhile, police officer DC Vam and his partner enter the hotel in the hopes of reaching the security room so they can track the terrorists' movements. Inside, Arjun attempts to escort a mortally wounded guest to a hospital, but upon encountering the officers, she panics and flees before being killed by a terrorist. Arjun escorts the officers to the security room where they discover the terrorists about to break into the Chambers Lounge. Vam orders Arjun to stay as he goes to attack the terrorists, successfully wounding one named Imran.

Against Oberoi's advice, Zahra and Vasili, along with several other guests, decide to leave the lounge to escape, but Zahra and Vasili are caught and taken hostage along with David, while the others are killed in their attempt to escape.

While guarding the hostages, Imran contacts his family members, and reveals that the terrorists left to attack Mumbai under the guise of military training. He also discovers that while the Bull had promised to pay the families of the terrorists, they have yet to receive any money from him.

Eventually, the NSG arrive, and the Bull orders the terrorists to burn the hotel down. The terrorists leave Imran to guard the hostages, and the Bull orders Imran to kill them. Imran shoots both David and Vasili, but spares Zahra when she begins reciting a Muslim prayer, allowing her to untie herself and escape.

Arjun regroups with Oberoi and evacuates the remaining guests, encountering Sally and Cameron in the process. The NSG kill the remaining terrorists, and Zahra is evacuated by an aerial work platform before reuniting with Sally and Cameron. After the hotel is secured, Arjun returns home to his wife and daughter.

A closing script reveals that those responsible for the attack remain free to this day, but the hotel was repaired and parts reopened within months of the event. The final scenes show a memorial to the staff and guests, and footage of the grand reopening of the hotel.

Cast

Production

Casting 
On 11 February 2016, it was announced that Dev Patel and Armie Hammer had been cast in the film, along with actors Nazanin Boniadi, Teresa Palmer, and Suhail Nayyar, while Nikolaj Coster-Waldau and Anupam Kher were in negotiations; Palmer and Coster-Waldau ultimately were not involved. John Collee and Anthony Maras wrote the screenplay, which Maras directed, while Basil Iwanyk produced the film through Thunder Road Pictures along with Jomon Thomas from Xeitgeist, Arclight Films' Gary Hamilton and Mike Gabrawy, Electric Pictures' Andrew Ogilvie, and Julie Ryan.

In June, Tilda Cobham-Hervey joined the cast after Teresa Palmer pulled out early into her second pregnancy, and in August, Jason Isaacs was cast. On 7 September 2016, Natasha Liu Bordizzo joined the film to play Bree, a tourist caught in the attack.

Filming
In August 2016, principal photography on the film began in the Adelaide Film studios, run by the South Australian Film Corporation. Filming continued in India in early 2017.

Release
In May 2016, the Weinstein Company acquired US and UK distribution rights to the film. However, in April 2018, it was announced that the Weinstein Company would no longer distribute the film. In August 2018, Bleecker Street and ShivHans Pictures acquired US distribution rights to the film.

The film had its world premiere at the Toronto International Film Festival on 7 September 2018. It was theatrically released in Australia on 14 March 2019, by Icon Film Distribution, and the United States on 22 March 2019. It was scheduled for a United Kingdom release in September 2019, by Sky Cinema and NowTV. Sky Cinema promoting it as a "Sky Cinema Original" in the United Kingdom.

The movie was pulled from cinemas in New Zealand due to the Christchurch mosque shootings on 15 March 2019, with showings suspended until 28 March.

Netflix was set to distribute the film in India and other South and Southeast Asian territories. However, Netflix later dropped the film, after a contractual dispute arose with Indian distributor Plus Holdings. The film was scheduled to be released theatrically in India on 29 November 2019 by Zee Studios and Purpose Entertainment. An official trailer of the film in Hindi was released by Zee Studios on 23 October 2019.

Reception

Box office
Hotel Mumbai has grossed $9.7 million in the United States and Canada, and $11.5 million in other territories, for a worldwide total of $21.2 million.

The film opened in four theaters in the US, on 22 March, and expanded to 924 on 29 March, grossing $3.1 million in that second weekend.

Critical response
Rex Reed of The New York Observer wrote: "There isn't a single wasted frame in this movie, which is both richly detailed and economically direct in its emotional impact-all the more astounding for a first feature film. Without exception, everyone is exemplary. The dialogue is delivered in nine languages, giving the film an even more compelling feeling of authenticity. The adrenaline flows immediately. Intense, hair-raising and deeply humane, Hotel Mumbai is a gripping, suspenseful achievement that overwhelms. You leave sated, with the rare feeling of having learned something about history and knowing you've been to one hell of a movie."

Katie Goh of The Guardian wrote: "Patel is subdued yet excellent in Anthony Maras's white knuckle retelling of the 2008 Mumbai terror attacks. ... For all its subplots, Maras keeps a tight leash on the film's narrative strands as we watch characters move in and out of each other's stories. Hotel Mumbai is an excellent, white-knuckle thriller – and an unlikely crowdpleaser."

Malina Saval of Variety wrote: "The cinematic result is a film that is as visually breathtaking as it is emotionally electrifying, an edge-of-your-seat study on the effects of tragedy and violence on a group of strangers banding together in a fight to survive the unthinkable."

Scott Menzel of We Live Entertainment wrote: "Hotel Mumbai is one of the year's best films as well as one of the most underrated and overlooked films to come out of the Toronto International Film Festival this year. Director Anthony Maras has created one of the most terrifying films that I have ever seen in my life. All of the actors and actresses involved as they did such an exceptional job. Hotel Mumbai is a near-perfect masterpiece."

Sujeet Rajan of the News India Times wrote: "Hotel Mumbai is undoubtedly the best foreign film ever made in India. Popular films by foreign and foreign-based Indian-origin directors, like Danny Boyle's 'Slumdog Millionaire' and Mira Nair's 'Salaam Bombay' showed the poverty and underbelly of the financial capital of India, but in terms of sheer production excellence, character realization and gripping story-telling, Hotel Mumbai stands head and shoulders above anything else canvassing India over the years."

Jordan Mintzer of The Hollywood Reporter wrote: "Maras does an excellent job on such an ambitious first feature, covering every corner of the hotel and making each gunshot or explosion feel like the real thing. The level of verisimilitude is so high that when Maras cuts in actual documentary footage, it's hard to tell it apart from the fiction. As close to reality as a movie can be."

Anne Cohen of Refinery29 wrote: "Anthony Maras' harrowing feature debut depicting the 2008 Mumbai attacks transcends those tired tropes to deliver one of most breathlessly stressful, emotional and insightful depictions of terrorism and its victims I've ever seen."

Jeff Sneider of Collider wrote: "Australian filmmaker Anthony Maras announces himself as a major director to watch with his feature debut Hotel Mumbai. It's a true ensemble piece, with a standout performance from Bollywood legend Anupam Kher, who registers strongest as the hotel's Chef and de facto leader of the hostages."

Andy Howell of Film Threat wrote: "The drama is white-knuckle intense and unrelenting. I'm astounded that this is director Anthony Maras' first feature length film. He's a master of building tension through a combination of building up characters that we care about and putting them in horrific jeopardy. No amount of words that can convey the sense of the film, because it is such a gutpunch of emotion. Experiencing it was so intense that I just couldn't get into the next movie I was scheduled to see. I had to process Hotel Mumbai. After the screening, much of the cast felt the same, as they had just seen it for the first time. Dev Patel struggled to answer a very basic question and apologized because he was at a loss for words after that incredibly emotional experience."

Peter Debruge of Variety magazine wrote: "As debut features go, it's a formidable achievement, delivering on the promise shown by Maras' harrowing 2011 short 'The Palace,' which earned him two Australian Academy of Cinema and Television Arts Awards. 'Hotel Mumbai' doesn't subscribe to traditional notions of heroism, providing no one even remotely action star-like to stand up to the gunmen. The puny local police squad appear clumsy and completely out of their depth, posing little threat to the terrorists. It took Indian Special Forces many hours to arrive on the scene, during which time, hotel guests and staff were repeatedly forced to decide between the most immediate impulse for survival (several employees take the opportunity to protect themselves and go home) and the far more selfless choice of risking their lives in hopes of saving others. Whatever else it may offer to audiences — vicarious thrills, emotional catharsis — 'Hotel Mumbai' serves as a testament to those remarkable individuals."

He went on to write, "Sitting through the harrowing events again nearly a decade later could hardly be described as entertainment, and the film plays to many of the same unseemly impulses that make disaster movies so compelling, exploiting the tragedy of the situation for spectacle's sake."

Matt Donnelly of TheWrap wrote: "Maras is confident and unflinching in this portrait of the 'mindless' terror, as one news report played in the film said. He is also masterful in delivering a range of emotions (including laughs, mostly thanks to an icy playboy portrayed by Jason Isaacs) and other small rewards for viewers stepping up for this real-life nightmare."

David Ehrlich of IndieWire wrote: "Dev Patel and Armie Hammer star in a lucid, humane, and almost unwatchably harrowing drama about the 2008 Mumbai terror attacks."

Kelle Long of the Motion Picture Association wrote: "There is not a weak performance among the ensemble cast. Director Anthony Maras gave himself the impossible task of leaving the audience uplifted under these horrific circumstances. He does this not by letting up on the agonizing details, but instead by filling the characters with bravery and dignity. There are moments of fear and distrust, but they are resolved with compassion and understanding. The extraordinary efforts they make to stay together and keep one another alive are incredible."

At the Toronto International Film Festival World Premiere, Patrick Frater of Variety wrote: "Ripples of applause broke out and then choked as the end credits rolled. Patrons of the Princess of Wales Theater greeted cast and crew on stage with a real sense of gratitude and anticipation. 'Slumdog Millionaire' star Dev Patel praised the film's grit. 'It didn't pull any punches', he said. 'It is an anthem of resistance.' That drew a roar of cheers, only to be topped by Maras' introduction of the real-life Chef Oberoi, who according to the film, did the most to maintain calm while the Indian authorities figured out what was going on inside the besieged Taj."

Keith Whittier of Ottawa Life Magazine wrote: "The most powerful film at the festival at this point. The retelling of the attacks on Mumbai is raw, realistic and extremely effective. I felt numb after seeing this film and was especially touched when I spoke with someone in the audience who said she was in Mumbai during the attacks and for the people there, it was there 9/11. Grade: A".

Joseph McQuade and Emily DeLuc of The Conversation wrote: "Few films actually take the viewer inside the experience of terror plots as they happen; this is where Hotel Mumbai ushers in a new complex path with audiences. This film paints with such gritty and meticulous attention to detail, Hotel Mumbai is ultimately not about violence as an act that is carried out upon passive victims. Instead, it is about the resistance, resilience and quiet heroism of people confronted by chaotic scenarios filled with impossible chronicles."

Dwight Brown wrote: "Edgy, nerve-wracking and nightmarish from beginning to end. Yet, surprisingly encouraging too. A brilliant script by John Collee and Anthony Maras with genius direction by Maras turns a true-life tragedy into a beacon of hope."

Kayleigh Donaldson from Pajiba wrote: "A tightly constructed piece of film-making that's truly human and avoids tired Hollywood pitfalls ... For such a large ensemble that has so many strings of plots to tie together, Maras is remarkably skilled at keeping everything tightly constructed. The story switches from character to character and that almost unbearable tension is sustained throughout. There is no lingering where it is not necessary, no needlessly overwrought exposition."

Alyssa Ayers, a senior fellow at the Council on Foreign Relations and who served as US deputy assistant secretary of state for South Asia, wrote in Time magazine: "The film portrays the humanity of heroism. But it also delivers a message: more than a decade on, justice for this brazen attack remains denied. The terrorist group responsible has remained at large in Pakistan. At a time when Pakistan-based terrorism has once again escalated tensions between India and Pakistan, this message could not be more timely. Hotel Mumbai brings this story - common knowledge in India, but little known in the United States - to vivid life."

On Rotten Tomatoes, the film holds an approval rating of  based on  reviews. The website's critical consensus reads, "Its depiction of real-life horror will strike some as exploitative, but Hotel Mumbai remains a well-made dramatization of tragic events." On Metacritic, the film has a weighted average score of 62 out of 100, based on 33 critics, indicating "generally favorable reviews". Audiences polled by PostTrak gave the film an overall positive score of 77% and a 50% "definite recommend".

Accolades

See also 
 The Attacks of 26/11

References

External links 

 
 
 
 

2018 films
2018 action thriller films
American action thriller films
Australian action thriller films
Indian action thriller films
Action films based on actual events
Thriller films based on actual events
Films about jihadism
Films based on the 2008 Mumbai attacks
Films directed by Anthony Maras
Films shot in Adelaide
Films shot in Mumbai
Films set in hotels
Films with screenplays by John Collee
Films set in the 2000s
Films set in 2008
Thunder Road Films films
Islamic terrorism in fiction
Icon Productions films
English-language Indian films
Indian films based on actual events
2010s American films